musiConnects is a non-profit music education organization and chamber music residency based in the Mattapan and Roslindale neighborhoods of Boston, Massachusetts. The organization's mission is to "model and teach self-expression, peer leadership and community development through the transformative power of chamber music." Founded in 2007 by violinist Betsy Hinkle, musiConnects operates two education programs and a concert season of chamber music performances in neighborhood venues such as schools, community centers, libraries, health centers, and assisted living communities.

History and programs 

In 2007, violinist Betsy Hinkle founded musiConnects as a chamber music residency at the James J. Chittick Elementary School in Mattapan, consisting of concerts, private lessons, and chamber music instruction. As of the 2020-21 season, the musiConnects Residency Program enrolls 40-50 students in tuition-free private lessons and small group instruction at partner organizations in and around Boston's Mattapan neighborhood: KIPP Academy Boston, BCYF Mattahunt Community Center, Boston Public Schools Mattahunt Elementary, and Lena Park Community Development Corporation. The musiConnects Roslindale Community Program enrolls 30-40 students in sliding-scale tuition private lessons at the organization's studio space in Roslindale Village.

musiConnects' first resident ensembles were the Boston Public Quartet (2007-2018) and the Sumner Quartet (2011-2018). The organization is currently staffed by six Resident Musician teaching artists and one full-time Executive Director.

References

External links 
 musiconnects.org
 Boston Globe
 New England Conservatory - Commencement 2017
 Dorcester Reporter

Culture of Boston
Non-profit organizations based in Boston